"The Darkling Thrush" is a poem by Thomas Hardy. Originally titled "By the Century's Deathbed", it was first published on 29 December 1900 in The Graphic. The poem was later published in London Times on 1 January, 1901. A deleted '1899' on the poem's manuscript suggests that it may have been written in that year. It was later included in a collection entitled Poems of the Past and the Present (1901).

Summary 
The first two stanzas describe a bleak winter landscape at dusk, and the feeling of lifelessness that it produces. In stanza three, the melancholy atmosphere is transformed when "an aged thrush, frail, gaunt, and small" suddenly launches into "a full-hearted evensong of joy illimited." The final stanza muses that since there was no apparent cause for such an ecstatic outburst, the bird's singing must have been inspired by "some blessed Hope, whereof he knew and I was unaware." The use of the word "darkling" recalls the same word in Matthew Arnold's Dover Beach (1867), a poem about loss of faith.

References

External links 

The Darkling Thrush at Encyclopedia.com

1900 poems
Poetry by Thomas Hardy
Works originally published in The Times